The Pampas fox (Lycalopex gymnocercus), also known as grey pampean fox, Pampas zorro, Azara's fox, or Azara's zorro (in Spanish also called , anglicized as aguarachay, in Portuguese also called ), is a medium-sized zorro, or "false" fox, native to the South American Pampas. Azara in some of its alternative common names is a reference to Spanish naturalist Félix de Azara.

Description

The Pampas fox resembles the culpeo or Andean fox in appearance and size, but has a proportionately wider snout, reddish fur on the head and neck, and a black mark on the muzzle. Its short, dense fur is grey over most of the body, with a black line running down the back and onto the tail, and pale, almost white, underparts. The ears are triangular, broad, and relatively large, and are reddish on the outer surface and white on the inner surface. The inner surfaces of the legs are similar in color to the underparts, while the outer surface is reddish on the fore limbs, and grey on the hind limbs; the lower hind limb also bears a distinctive black spot.

In the northern part of its range, the pampas fox is more richly colored than in the southern part.

Distribution and habitat
The Pampas fox can be found in northern and central Argentina, Uruguay, eastern Bolivia, Paraguay, and southern Brazil. It prefers open pampas habitats, often close to agricultural land, but can also be found in montane or chaco forest, dry scrubland, and wetland habitats.

Three subspecies are currently recognized, while L. g. gracilis, L. g. domeykoanus and L. g. maulinicus were transferred to L. griseus. 

 L. g. gymnocercus - Found in the subtropical grasslands of northeastern Argentina, Uruguay, Paraguay, Bolivia and eastern Brazil.
 L. g. lordi - Restricted to the Chaco-Yungas Mountain Tropical Forest in Salta and Jujuy Provinces.
 L. g. antiquus - Found in the Pampas grasslands, Monte shrublands and Espinal open woodlands of central Argentina, from Córdoba and San Luis Provinces to the Rio Negro and the Atlantic coast.

Fossils of this species are known from the late Pliocene to early Pleistocene of Argentina.

Local names
In the Spanish-speaking areas of its habitat, the Pampas fox is known by the common names of zorro de las pampas or zorro gris pampeano. In Portuguese-speaking Brazil, it is called by the common names of graxaim or sorro.

Behavior and diet
The Pampas foxes mostly live a solitary life, but come together as monogamous pairs in the breeding season to raise their young. They are mainly nocturnal, becoming active at dusk, although may also be active during the day. They den in any available cavity, including caves, hollow trees, and the burrows of viscachas or armadillos. Even when raising young together, adult foxes generally hunt alone, marking their territory by defecating at specific latrine sites.

Pampas foxes are more omnivorous than most other canids, and have a varied and opportunistic diet. Their primary prey consists of birds, rodents, hares, fruit, carrion, and insects, although they also eat lizards, armadillos, snails and other invertebrates, lambs, and the eggs of ground-nesting birds. Their primary predators are pumas, domesticated dogs, and anacondas, most notably the yellow anaconda.

Reproduction
Pampas foxes breed in the early spring, with the female coming into heat just once each year. After a gestation period of 55 to 60 days, the mother gives birth to a litter of up to eight kits. The young are born between September and December, and are weaned around two months of age. Females reach sexual maturity in their first year, and animals have lived for up to 14 years in captivity.

Pups remain in dens until at least the age of 3 months, when they start hunting with parents. The males bring food to their females who stay at the den with kits.

Threats

The main threats to the Pampas fox comes from humans hunting them for their fur, to prevent them from attacking livestock, and may be affected by the loss of their natural habitat, although, because they remain common in most areas where they have been studied, the Pampas fox is not presently considered a threatened species.

References

External links

South American foxes
Mammals of Argentina
Mammals of Bolivia
Mammals of Brazil
Mammals of Paraguay
Mammals of Uruguay
Pampas
Least concern biota of South America
pampas fox